Domhnall Albanach Ó Troighthigh (fl. 1477-1482) was an Irish scribe and physician.

Domhnall Albanach was a member of the Uí Troighthigh medical family based in Corcomroe in the medieval era. In 1477 he compiled from older materials the Tripartite Life of St Patrick - a statement at the end of the manuscript states that it was written in 1477 at Bailé an Mhoinin in the house of Ó Troighthigh.

In 1482 he compiled the medical treatise Lilium Medicinae (Lile na h-Eladhan leighis). This manuscript was in 1500 sold to Gerald Mór FitzGerald, 8th Earl of Kildare.

See also
Ó Troighthigh
Irish medical families

References
"Education in Ancient and Medieval Ireland", Fergal McGrath, Studies, Special Publication, Dublin, 1979, p. 211.
"Lectures on the Manuscript Materials of Ancient Irish History", by Eugene O'Curry, James Duffy publishing, Dublin, 1861, p. 346.

Medieval European scribes
15th-century Irish writers
15th-century Irish medical doctors
People from County Clare
Year of death unknown
Irish scribes
Irish-language writers
Irish Latinists
15th-century births